Robert Lee Randall (born June 10, 1948) is an American former professional baseball second baseman and college baseball coach. He played five seasons in Major League Baseball from  until , all for the Minnesota Twins. He graduated from Gove High School and Kansas State University.

Professional playing career
Randall was selected by the Los Angeles Dodgers in three separate drafts: 1966, 1968, and finally the 2nd round in 1969, after which he signed. For the next five and a half years, he played 744 games in the Dodgers' farm system and batted over .300 four times, but was never promoted to the major league level. Then, on December 23, 1975, he got his first break when he was traded to the Twins in exchange for reserve outfielder Danny Walton.

Randall's second, perhaps more important, break was Minnesota manager Gene Mauch's decision to move future Hall of Famer Rod Carew to first base, opening up second base for Randall, who beat out Jerry Terrell for the job in spring training. Randall capitalized on the opportunity, batting .267 in 153 games in 1976 while finishing fourth in the American League in sacrifice hits.

That turned out to be the high mark of Randall's career. He spent the next two seasons splitting time at second base with Rob Wilfong, losing the starting job to the lefty-hitting Wilfong entirely in 1979. The following spring, he was released by the Twins and briefly served as a coach, then was restored to the active playing roster in May. For his MLB career, he collected 341 hits, including 50 doubles, nine triples, and one home run, a solo blow hit June 23, 1976, against Chris Knapp of the Chicago White Sox at Metropolitan Stadium. Randall batted .257 lifetime with 91 runs batted in.

College baseball coach
Following Randall's major league career, he turned to the college coaching ranks. He is currently the assistant baseball coach and a professor of economics at Manhattan Christian College.

Head coaching record

References

External links

1948 births
Living people
Albuquerque Dodgers players
Albuquerque Dukes players
Arizona Instructional League Dodgers players
Bakersfield Dodgers players
Baseball coaches from Kansas
Baseball players from Kansas
Iowa State Cyclones baseball coaches
Kansas Jayhawks baseball coaches
Kansas State Wildcats baseball players
Major League Baseball second basemen
Minnesota Twins coaches
Minnesota Twins players
Ogden Dodgers players
People from Norton, Kansas
Spokane Indians players
Toledo Mud Hens players
Waterbury Dodgers players